Lorna Doone is a brand of golden, square-shaped shortbread cookie produced by Nabisco and owned by Mondelez International. Introduced in March 1912, it was possibly named after the main character in R. D. Blackmore's 1869 novel, Lorna Doone, but no record exists as to the exact motivation behind the name.

The original cookie recipe came from the Malloys, Emily and John, who came from County Cork, Ireland, and ran a bakery in Chicago. Emily had created the recipe, but when they closed down the bakery, John sold the recipe to F. A. Kennedy Steam Bakery which had also first produced the Fig Newton in 1891.

A box of Lorna Doone can be seen, in cartoon form, in Mickey's Surprise Party (1939) a theatrical advertisement/cartoon short produced by Walt Disney Productions for Nabisco.

See also
 List of shortbread biscuits and cookies

References

External links
 

Brand name cookies
Nabisco brands
Mondelez International brands
Shortbread
Products introduced in 1912
American snack foods